The Kaskapau Formation is a geological formation in North America whose strata date back to the Late Cretaceous. 

The name derives from kaskapahtew (ᑲᐢᑲᐸᐦᑌᐤ), the Cree word for "smoky". It was first described on the banks of the Smoky River, close to the confluence with the Puskwaskau River by F.H. McLearn in 1926.

Geographical distribution 

It is exposed along the Peace River near Dunvegan, as well as in the Smoky River area.

The formation is part of the Smoky River Group, and is conformably overlain by the Bad Heart Formation in the western area, and unconformably by the Cardium Formation in the Pouce Coupe River area. It is conformable underlain by the Dunvegan Formation.

The Kaskapau Formation is equivalent to the Colorado Group shale in central Alberta. It is equivalent to the upper Blackstone Formation, the Cardium Formation, and the Muskiki Formation in the Canadian Rockies foothills in western Alberta.

Lithology 
The Kaskapau Formation is represented mostly by dark grey shale, with sandstone tongues and lentils at the base (Doe Creek Member, Pouce Coupe Member). Thin volcanic ash layers may occur in the British Columbia foothills.

Paleontology 
Oyster fossils are encountered at the base of the formation, and Inoceramus fragments (such as I. labiatus) are found throughout the entire stack. Ammonites are also present in the sand beds, genus encountered include Dunveganoceras and Watinoceras in the lower part and Scaphites in the upper part. Microfauna include benthonic (and fewer planktonic) foraminifera. An indeterminate hadrosaurid and a possible nodosaurid are known from Quality Creek.

References 

Stratigraphy of Alberta
Stratigraphy of British Columbia
Upper Cretaceous Series of North America
Cretaceous Alberta
Cretaceous British Columbia
Coniacian Stage
Turonian Stage